Zhawar is an area within the Khost Province of Afghanistan.

Zhawar Kili
Jalaluddin Haqqani was (is) known by Afghani mujahideen as master of the Zhawar Kili cave complex. (B.G. Williams 2013).

Mir Bahmanyar writes of the caves during 1986. He states there were caves carved into the rock face on the side facing Pakistan. The caves were ten metres long at the maximum, four metres wide and three metres tall. The cave sides had walls of brick. Altogether there were forty-one caves. The caves had  doors of iron painted over with bright colours. All the caves were fitted with electrical power.

Zhawar Kili is suspected to have been an area where al Qaeda fighters regrouped after the bombardment of Tora Bora and is located at 33.148792 N, 69.912658 E.

The Zhawar Kili al Badr training camp was based here during 2002.

A statement published January 2002, showing the report of the deputy director of operations for the Joint Chiefs of Staff at the time, stated the site was a very large complex (approximately 4.8 by 4.8 kilometres square roughly). Rear Adm. J.D. Stufflebeem stated of the Zhawar Kili al Badr training camp, that it contained at least sixty buildings and caves of a number greater than fifty.

January 2002 saw the insertion of a supported Navy Seals team, who were positioned to perform reconnaissance. Upon discovering a complex of approximately seventy caves converted to facilities for ordnance, they instead proceeded to perform the destruction of this. At the location the men also found classrooms, rooms for cooking, quarters for sleep, and offices, which were constructed using bricks, concrete and steel beams.

Bombing

The location is the site of a suspected Taliban or al Qaeda base that was bombed in 1998 and 2001.

American cruise missiles bombed a suspected al Qaeda site in Zhawar Kili in 1998 in retaliation for the bombing of the American Embassies in Kenya and Tanzania in 1998.

The United States Air Force performed bombings during 2001. A bombing during November 2001, was indirectly caused by  Richard A. Beck, a geologist at the University of Cincinnati who informed the Department of Defense he could identify the rocks showing within video footage of Osama bin Laden released during October 2001, from a field trip he had made to Khowst. Ascertainment of the location was facilitated by the utilization of GIS technology and remote sensing.

During 2002, a period of bombing began, apparently, during the 3rd of January, and included a period from the 6th to the 14th of  January 2002. The United States (of America) Department of Defense released a video of the bombardment of Zhawar Kili during March 2002.

Gallery

Location from above

See also

Qanat
Tora Bora

Notes

References

External links
D.B. Edwards (1984) - text Ethnographic Fieldwork: An Anthropological Reader published by John Wiley & Sons, 24 Jan 2012

Caves of Afghanistan
Caves used for hiding
History of Paktia Province
Landforms of Afghanistan